The Great Waltz is a 1938 American biographical film based very loosely on the life of Johann Strauss II. It starred Luise Rainer, Fernand Gravet (Gravey), and Miliza Korjus. Rainer received top billing at the producer's insistence, but her role is comparatively minor as Strauss' wife, Poldi Vogelhuber. It was the only starring role for Korjus, who was a famous opera soprano and played one in the film.

Joseph Ruttenberg won the Academy Award for Best Cinematography. Korjus was nominated for Supporting Actress, and Tom Held for Film Editing.
The film was popular in Australia, and was distributed largely throughout Sydney and Melbourne for two years after its initial release.

The film has no connection with the 1934 Broadway play The Great Waltz.

Plot summary
The highly fictionalised story sees "Schani" dismissed from his job in a bank. He puts together a group of unemployed musicians who wangle a performance at Dommayer's cafe. The audience is minimal, but when two opera singers, Carla Donner (Miliza Korjus) and Fritz Schiller (George Houston), visit whilst their carriage is being repaired, the music attracts a wider audience.

Strauss is caught up in a student protest; he and Carla Donner avoid arrest and escape to the Vienna Woods, where he is inspired to create the waltz "Tales from the Vienna Woods".

Carla asks Strauss for some music to sing at an aristocratic soiree, and this leads to the composer receiving a publishing contract. He's on his way, and he can now marry Poldi Vogelhuber, his sweetheart. But the closeness of Strauss and Carla Donner, during rehearsals of operettas, attracts comment, not least from Count Hohenfried, Donner's admirer.

Poldi remains loyal to Strauss, and the marriage is a long one. He is received by the Kaiser Franz Joseph I of Austria (whom he unknowingly insulted in the aftermath of the student protests), and the two stand before cheering crowds on the balcony of Schönbrunn.

Cast
 Luise Rainer as Poldi Vogelhuber
 Fernand Gravet as Johann Strauss II
 Miliza Korjus as Carla Donner
 Hugh Herbert as Hofbauer
 Lionel Atwill as Count Hohenfried
 Curt Bois as Kienzl
 Al Shean as Cellist
 Minna Gombell as Mrs. Hofbauer
 Alma Kruger as Mrs. Strauss
 Greta Meyer as Mrs. Vogelhuber
 Bert Roachas Vogelhuber
 Henry Hull as Franz Joseph I of Austria
 Sig Rumann as Wertheimer
 George Houston as Schiller
 Herman Bing as Dommayer
 Christian Rub as Coachman
 Frank Mayo as Ship's Officer (uncredited)
 Larry Steers as Man in Uniform (uncredited)

Box office
According to MGM records, the film earned $918,000 in the US and Canada, and $1,504,000 elsewhere, resulting in a loss of $724,000.

Re-make

The film was re-made in 1972, with Horst Buchholz playing Strauss, alongside Mary Costa, Nigel Patrick, and Yvonne Mitchell.

References

External links

 
 
 
 1972 remake: 

American historical films
American biographical films
1930s historical films
1930s biographical films
1938 films
American black-and-white films
1930s English-language films
Metro-Goldwyn-Mayer films
Films set in the 19th century
Films set in Vienna
Films about classical music and musicians
Films about composers
Cultural depictions of Franz Joseph I of Austria
Cultural depictions of Johann Strauss II
Films whose cinematographer won the Best Cinematography Academy Award
Films directed by Julien Duvivier
Films directed by Victor Fleming 
Films directed by Josef von Sternberg
Films set in Austria-Hungary
1930s American films